Pavel Kudrnáč (born 11 February 1974) is a former professional tennis player from the Czech Republic.

Biography
As a junior, Kudrnáč competed in the boys singles and doubles events at the 1992 French Open.

He was a leading collegiate player during his time at Oklahoma State. In 1998 he topped the ITA rankings and was honoured with the Senior Player of the Year award.

Kudrnáč, who comes from Plzeň, represented the Czech Republic in multiple editions of the Summer Universiade, most notably at the 1999 event, where he was a gold medalist in the men's doubles.

On the professional tour he was a doubles specialist and regularly partnered fellow Czech Petr Kovačka. With the exception of his first tournament, the 1995 Prague Open with Petr Luxa, he played beside Kovačka in all of his ATP Tour appearances, which included making the semi-finals at San Marino in 2000. They competed in the 2000 US Open, beaten in the first round by Argentina's Gastón Etlis and Sebastián Prieto. At Challenger level, the pair won a total of three doubles titles.

Challenger titles

Doubles: (3)

References

External links
 
 

1974 births
Living people
Czech male tennis players
Universiade medalists in tennis
Oklahoma State Cowboys tennis players
Sportspeople from Plzeň
Universiade gold medalists for the Czech Republic
Universiade silver medalists for the Czech Republic
Medalists at the 1997 Summer Universiade
Medalists at the 1999 Summer Universiade
Medalists at the 2001 Summer Universiade
20th-century Czech people